Adnan Zahirović (born 23 March 1990) is a Bosnian professional footballer who plays as a defensive midfielder for AC Milan Heidenheim.

Club career
Zahirović started his career at Čelik Zenica in Bosnia and Herzegovina, where he played for two seasons.

In 2011, he was transferred to Russian side Spartak Nalchik.

He was then loaned to Dinamo Minsk.

He moved to German club VfL Bochum in July 2013.

On 17 July 2015 he signed for Hapoel Acre.

In February 2016, after terminating his contract with Hapoel, he signed a two-year deal with Bosnian side Željezničar. However, that summer he rescinded his contract with the Sarajevo-based club, signing for RNK Split. Zahirović would go on to feature in only two games for the Croatian club, parting ways with it in December 2016.

He signed for FK Mladost Doboj Kakanj in June 2017.
On 28 June 2018, Zahirović left Mladost after one year, 15 league games and 1 league goal.

On 17 October 2019, Zahirović joined German amateur club SV Neresheim. In summer 2020 he moved on to AC Milan Heidenheim.

International career
Zahirović was a member of Bosnia and Herzegovina under-21 squad, making five appearances.

He made his international debut in 2010, in a friendly game against Poland. and has earned a total of 20 caps, scoring no goals. His final international was an October 2013 World Cup qualification match against Lithuania.

Career statistics

Club

International

References

External links
 
 Adnan Zahirović at FuPa

1990 births
Living people
Sportspeople from Banja Luka
Association football midfielders
Bosnia and Herzegovina footballers
Bosnia and Herzegovina under-21 international footballers
Bosnia and Herzegovina international footballers
NK Čelik Zenica players
PFC Spartak Nalchik players
FC Dinamo Minsk players
VfL Bochum players
VfL Bochum II players
Hapoel Acre F.C. players
FK Željezničar Sarajevo players
RNK Split players
FK Mladost Doboj Kakanj players
R.E. Virton players
Premier League of Bosnia and Herzegovina players
Russian Premier League players
Russian First League players
Belarusian Premier League players
2. Bundesliga players
Regionalliga players
Israeli Premier League players
Croatian Football League players
Belgian Third Division players
Bosnia and Herzegovina expatriate footballers
Expatriate footballers in Russia
Expatriate footballers in Belarus
Expatriate footballers in Germany
Expatriate footballers in Israel
Expatriate footballers in Croatia
Expatriate footballers in Belgium
Bosnia and Herzegovina expatriate sportspeople in Russia
Bosnia and Herzegovina expatriate sportspeople in Belarus
Bosnia and Herzegovina expatriate sportspeople in Germany
Bosnia and Herzegovina expatriate sportspeople in Israel
Bosnia and Herzegovina expatriate sportspeople in Croatia
Bosnia and Herzegovina expatriate sportspeople in Belgium